David Ross Hynds (15 September 1946 – 25 June 2015) was a New Zealand Paralympic sportsperson. In the 1976 Summer Paralympics he competed in athletics, winning a bronze medal in the men's discus throw 1C. Hynds made his debut at these Games, going on to represent New Zealand at the 1976, 1980, 1984, and 1992 in archery and athletics.

Hynds attended Saint Kentigern Old Collegians. When he was a 22-year-old, he was in a car accident that left him a paraplegic. Starting in 1970, he started competing in New Zealand's National Disabled Championships and would compete in it for 30 straight years. At the 1974 Commonwealth Paraplegic Games, he served as New Zealand's Vice Captain. After the Games, he made the switch to wheelchair rugby, making New Zealand's first national team in 1991. He also took up sailing, representing New Zealand internationally from 1988 to 1998.  In 2006, he was awarded Order of Merit for outstanding service to Paralympic Sport.  He died in 2015.

References

External links 
 
 

1946 births
2015 deaths
Paralympic athletes of New Zealand
Paralympic archers of New Zealand
New Zealand male discus throwers
New Zealand male shot putters
New Zealand male archers
Paralympic silver medalists for New Zealand
Paralympic bronze medalists for New Zealand
Paralympic medalists in athletics (track and field)
Athletes (track and field) at the 1976 Summer Paralympics
Athletes (track and field) at the 1980 Summer Paralympics
Athletes (track and field) at the 1984 Summer Paralympics
Athletes (track and field) at the 1992 Summer Paralympics
Archers at the 1980 Summer Paralympics
Archers at the 1984 Summer Paralympics
Medalists at the 1976 Summer Paralympics
Medalists at the 1980 Summer Paralympics
Medalists at the 1984 Summer Paralympics
Wheelchair discus throwers
Wheelchair shot putters
Paralympic discus throwers
Paralympic shot putters